Estoloides sparsa is a species of beetle in the family Cerambycidae. It was described by Linsley in 1942. It is known from Baja California.

References

Estoloides
Beetles described in 1942